Kępice  (or Hômer) is a town and seat of Gmina Kępice in Słupsk County, Pomeranian Voivodeship, northern Poland. Kępice was granted town rights in 1967.

Cities and towns in Pomeranian Voivodeship
Słupsk County